Backeljaia is a genus of small to medium-sized, air-breathing land snails, terrestrial pulmonate gastropod mollusks in the family Geomitridae, the hairy snails and their allies.

Species
Species within the genus Backeljaia include:
 Backeljaia camporroblensis (Fez, 1944)
 Backeljaia corbellai (Martínez-Ortí, 2011)
 Backeljaia gigaxii (L. Pfeiffer, 1847)
 Backeljaia najerensis (Ortiz de Zárate y López, 1950)

References

External links
 Chueca, L. J., Gómez-Moliner, B. J., Madeira, M. J. & Pfenninger, M. (2018). Molecular phylogeny of Candidula (Geomitridae) land snails inferred from mitochondrial and nuclear markers reveals the polyphyly of the genus. Molecular Phylogenetics and Evolution. 118: 357-368

 
Gastropod genera
Taxonomy articles created by Polbot